Gustavo Adrián Ruelas Aguilar (born March 18, 1991) is an American former professional soccer player who played as a forward.

Club career
Ruelas signed for Club Santos Laguna, and captained the Santos under-20 team. Celtic agreed to a deal with Santos Laguna, for a one-year loan with an option to buy him, but the move was not made permanent. Ruelas made his debut for the Santos first team on March 5, 2011, in a 3–2 loss to Club América.

International career
Ruelas was called up to the Mexico U17 national team. He was also called to the United States U20.

References

1991 births
Living people
American soccer players
Soccer players from California
Santos Laguna footballers
Celtic F.C. players
Chiapas F.C. footballers
C.D. Veracruz footballers
Liga MX players
People from Fontana, California
American sportspeople of Mexican descent
Expatriate footballers in Mexico
United States men's under-20 international soccer players
American expatriate sportspeople in Mexico
Expatriate footballers in Scotland
Association football forwards